Aethes rubigana, the burdock conch, is a moth of the family Tortricidae. It was described by Treitschke in 1830. It is found in most of Europe, except the Iberian Peninsula and part of the Balkan Peninsula. Outside of Europe, it is found in China (Beijing, Hebei, Heilongjiang, Jilin, Liaoning, Ningxia), Japan and Russia.

The forewings have a moderately arched costa. They pale ochreous, with several obscure shining whitish striae with a dark brown spot along the base of the costa. There is a narrow dark brown antemedian fascia, angulated above the middle and  interrupted below the angle and abruptly dilated on the dorsum . The subterminal fascia is represented by dark brown spots on costa and dorsum, and a very indistinct spot between them. The hindwings are rather dark grey.

Adults are on wing from late June to August in western Europe.

The larvae feed on the seedheads Arctium species (including Arctium lappa and possibly Arctium minus). Full-grown larvae overwinter from October in a cocoon on the ground or occasionally in the seedhead. Pupation takes place within this cocoon.

References

rubigana
Moths described in 1830
Moths of Asia
Moths of Europe
Moths of Japan